Statistics of Úrvalsdeild in the 1970 season.

Overview
It was contested by 8 teams, and ÍA won the championship. ÍBA's Hermann Gunnarsson was the top scorer with 14 goals.

League standings

Results
Each team played every opponent once home and away for a total of 14 matches.

References

Úrvalsdeild karla (football) seasons
Iceland
Iceland
1970 in Icelandic football